World Cleanup Day is an annual global social action program aimed at combating the global solid waste problem, including the problem of marine debris. It is coordinated by the global organization Let's Do It! World, the headquarters is located in Tallinn, Estonia. The next World Cleanup Day is 16 September 2023.

World Cleanup Day includes litter cleanup and waste mapping activities spanning every time zone. Environmental cleanup events are held in nearly every country until concluding near the international date line in Hawaii and American Samoa.

Purpose

World Cleanup Day is held over the course of a 24-hour period, on the 3rd Saturday of September annually. World Cleanup Day aims to raise awareness of the mismanaged waste crisis by mobilizing all spheres of society to participate in cleanup actions. Individuals, governments, corporations and organizations are all encouraged to take part in cleanups and to find solutions to tackle mismanaged waste. There are numerous organizations that facilitate and host World Cleanup Day events globally. Like Earth Day, World Cleanup Day is non-partisan, apolitical, and is not affiliated with any national or global political party or discrete ideology.

History
The inaugural World Cleanup Day was 15 September 2018, but it builds on the successes of previous global cleanup efforts. The goal of World Cleanup Day 2018 was to involve 5% of the world's population (or approximately 380 million people). While the effort fell short of the goal, it directly mobilized 18 million people worldwide.

The 2019 World Cleanup Day was held on the 19th of September and coincided with Peace Day and the Global climate strike of September 2019.

Global cleanup efforts have existed in many forms throughout human history, especially after widespread catastrophes such as earthquakes, floods, and powerful tsunamis.

In modern history, these efforts are typically undertaken by the affected communities, with support from various international organizations and NGOs, such as Red Cross, Oxfam, and other relief organizations but typically in post-conflict zones. They have included efforts to remove land mines, beach cleanups, and other municipal and non-governmental actions.

Participants 
Participants in World Cleanup Days are typically volunteers, with coordination from non-governmental organizations who assist in awareness-raising, logistics, and fundraising.

List of World Cleanup Days
 World Cleanup Day 2018, 15 September 2018, with 17,6 million people across 157 countries. Over  tons of waste was registered and collected.
 World Cleanup Day 2019, 21 September 2019, with 21 million people across 180 countries. Over  tons of waste was registered and collected.
 World Cleanup Day 2020, 19 September 2020, with 11 million people across 166 countries. Over  tons of waste was registered and collected.
 World Cleanup Day 2021, 18 September 2021, with 8,5 million people across 191 countries. Over  tons of waste was registered and collected.
 World Cleanup Day 2022, 17 September 2022, with 14,9 million people across 190 countries. Over  tons of waste was registered and collected.
 World Cleanup Day 2023 will be held on 16 September.

See also
 Clean-up (environment)
 Let's Do It 2008
 Let's Clean Slovenia in One Day!
 Let's Clean Slovenia 2012
 Earth Day
 National Cleanup Day
 The Ocean Cleanup
 Voluntary ecological year

References

External links
 Official website

International environmental organizations
September events